Wild Britain with Ray Mears is a television series hosted by Ray Mears. He explores some of Britain's more inaccessible countryside to discover wildlife.

Episodes

Series 1

Series 2

Series 3

See also
Extreme Survival
Ray Mears' Bushcraft
Wild Food
Ray Mears' Northern Wilderness
Survival with Ray Mears

References

External links
RayMears.com

2010 British television series debuts
2013 British television series endings
2010s British documentary television series
ITV documentaries
Works about survival skills
Television series by ITV Studios
English-language television shows